Kam Erika Heskin (born May 8, 1973) is an American actress. She began her career playing Caitlin Deschanel on the NBC daytime soap opera Sunset Beach (1998–1999), before appearing in films Planet of the Apes (2001) and Catch Me If You Can (2002). Heskin went on in 2003 to play Elizabeth Bennet in an independent film Pride & Prejudice: A Latter-Day Comedy, Robin in Charmed (2004),  and Paige Morgan in The Prince and Me film franchise (2006–2010).

Early life
Heskin was born in Grand Forks, North Dakota. She attended Grand Junction High School before she went on to study at Concordia College in Minnesota, graduating with a degree in Communications and Political Science. The day after graduation, she moved to Chicago and modeled for the next couple of months before moving to New York City.

Career
Heskin' first role came in early 1998, when director John Woo selected her as the lead in his pilot Blackjack starring Dolph Lundgren and Kate Vernon. Later that year, she replaced Vanessa Dorman as Caitlin Deschanel on the NBC daytime soap opera Sunset Beach. Heskin portrayed the role until the end of the show, December 31, 1999. She later guest-starred on The WB shows include 7th Heaven, Angel, and Charmed. Heskin later returned to daytime television, briefly replacing McKenzie Westmore as Sheridan Crane on Passions in 2006 and 2008, while actress was on a leave of absence on two occasions.

In 2000, Heskin played the female lead role in the thriller film Held for Ransom. The movie was released direct-to-video, never gaining a theatrical release in the United States. She later had small parts in Tomcats, Planet of the Apes and Catch Me If You Can, before a leading role in the independent comedy film Pride & Prejudice: A Latter-Day Comedy (2003). In 2005, she had role in the box office bomb comedy Dirty Love starring Jenny McCarthy. The following year, she was cast as Paige Morgan (replacing Julia Stiles) in the romantic comedy film The Prince & Me 2: The Royal Wedding, a sequel to the 2004 film The Prince and Me. She later has starred in The Prince and Me 3: A Royal Honeymoon (2008), and The Prince and Me 4: The Elephant Adventure (2010).

Filmography

Film

Television

References

External links

1973 births
Living people
People from Grand Forks, North Dakota
20th-century American actresses
21st-century American actresses
American film actresses
American soap opera actresses
American television actresses